Allium staticiforme is a species of onion native to Greece and western Turkey, including the islands of the Aegean Sea.

References

staticiforme
Onions
Flora of Greece
Flora of Turkey
Plants described in 1809